The 1974 NCAA Division II basketball tournament involved 44 schools playing in a single-elimination tournament to determine the national champion of men's NCAA Division II college basketball as a culmination of the 1973–74 NCAA Division II men's basketball season. It was won by Morgan State University and Morgan State's Marvin Webster was the Most Outstanding Player.

This was the first tournament to be officially designated as a Division II basketball championship. The NCAA first split into competitive divisions for the 1956–57 school year, creating the top-level University Division and second-tier College Division. Effective with the 1973–74 school year, the NCAA adopted the three-division system that exists to this day. The University Division was renamed Division I, while the College Division was split into Division II and the non-scholarship Division III.

Regional participants

*denotes tie

Regionals

South Atlantic – Norfolk, Virginia
Location: Norfolk Scope Host: Old Dominion University

Third Place – Roanoke 88, Rollins 77

New England – Waltham, Massachusetts
Location: Dana Center Host: Bentley College

Third Place – St. Michael's 95, Bentley 91

East – Canton, New York
Location: Burkman Gymnasium Host: Saint Lawrence University

Third Place – Siena 82, Potsdam State 74

Mideast – Reading, Pennsylvania
Location: Bollman Center Host: Albright College

Third Place – King's 111, Hiram 81

Great Lakes – Evansville, Indiana
Location: Roberts Municipal Stadium Host: University of Evansville

Third Place – Evansville 87, Wisconsin–Green Bay 75

Midwest – Springfield, Missouri
Location: Hammons Center Host: Southwest Missouri State University

Third Place – North Dakota 75, St. Cloud State 71

South – Nashville, Tennessee
Location: unknown Host: Tennessee State University

Third Place – Tennessee State 98, Southern 88

West – San Luis Obispo, California
Location: Mott Gym Host: California Polytechnic State University, San Luis Obispo

Third Place – Cal Poly 81, Chico State 63

*denotes each overtime played

National Finals – Evansville, Indiana
Location: Roberts Municipal Stadium Host: University of Evansville

Third Place – Assumption 115, New Orleans 103

*denotes each overtime played

All-tournament team
 William Doolittle (Southwest Missouri State)
 John Grochowski (Assumption)
 Randy Magers (Southwest Missouri State)
 Alvin O'Neal (Morgan State)
 Marvin Webster (Morgan State)

See also
 1974 NCAA Division I basketball tournament
 1974 NAIA Basketball Tournament

References

Sources
 2010 NCAA Men's Basketball Championship Tournament Records and Statistics: Division II men's basketball Championship
 1974 NCAA Division II men's basketball tournament jonfmorse.com

NCAA Division II men's basketball tournament
Tournament
NCAA Division II basketball tournament
NCAA Division II basketball tournament